Pac-12 Conference basketball may refer to:
Pac-12 Conference men's basketball
Pac-12 Conference women's basketball, the women's basketball program of the Pac-12 Conference